Miamiville is an unincorporated community and census-designated place (CDP) in western Miami Township, Clermont County, Ohio, United States, along the Little Miami River and the Loveland Bike Trail. As of the 2010 census it had a population of 242. It has a post office with the ZIP code 45147.

History 
Miamiville was laid out in 1849, and named for the nearby Little Miami River. A post office called Miamiville has been in operation since 1848.

Miamiville's low profile as an unincorporated community was a benefit during the Great Depression, when Prohibition outlawed alcohol consumption in the United States. The Miami Boat Club operated as a speakeasy during the 1920s and 1930s.

Miamiville also played a small role in the Civil War during the Battle of Miamiville as rebels known as Morgan's Raids marched toward Camp Dennison and Cincinnati in the 1860s.

Gallery

References

Census-designated places in Clermont County, Ohio